The 2022 Wakefield Trinity season is the 24th consecutive season in the Super League and their 127th season at the Belle Vue. Wakefield were coached by Willie Poching and they competed in both Super League XXVII and the 2022 Challenge Cup.

2022 Super League table

2022 squad

External links
Rugby League Project
Official Website
Wakefield RLFans Forum

Wakefield Trinity seasons
2022 in English rugby league
Super League XXVII by club